George P. Johnson or GPJ is an American multinational corporation that specializes in event marketing and brand marketing, with headquarters located in Auburn Hills, Michigan, United States. GPJ operates primarily as a marketing and advertisement firm, providing digital, multimedia and physical marketing interactions, as well as offering brand management services and consulting, however GPJ specializes in more traditional physical event management. GPJ has a wide variety of clients in various industries: automotive, technology, software, food & beverage, entertainment, including over 40 Fortune 500 Companies.

The company was founded in 1914 by its namesake George P. Johnson in Detroit, Michigan as a flag-making and sail-repair establishment. Initially establishing itself as an event management firm in the Detroit area automotive industry, the company's early years were heavily rooted in working with the automobile industry and managing trade shows and events. Expansion of the company took place around the 1990s as GPJ started up offices in Boston, Seattle, Chicago and Brussels, Belgium. This period also saw tremendous growth for the firm, as they began to diversify and internationalize. The company also gained notability with a partnership with IBM.

History

Origins (1910s-1940s) 

Founded in 1914, George P. Johnson was established as a flag-maker and sail repairs establishment by its namesake.  The company originally involved itself with the Detroit Auto Show, working on the auto industry's annual exhibit of new vehicles, due to Johnson's prior involvement with the event. Throughout the years, Johnson's company began producing banners, flags and buntings for parade floats and special exhibits. With the trade show in Detroit growing to greater prominence the early GPJ had established itself as one of the leading creators.

Formative years (1950s-1980s) 

In 1956 GPJ assisted in producing the first International Auto Show in New York. Later in 1961, the firm introduced the spinning turntable for presenting cars, which would later become an industry standard for many such events. This was the company's first venture outside of the Detroit area automotive events. In 1976, Johnson's grandson Robert G. Vallee Jr. began working at the company, and two years later he was assigned as the head of production. In 1980, Vallee after being appointed account executive, was assigned to work with American Honda, one of the first foreign carmakers that the company had worked with. In 1985, an office was opened in Los Angeles, and with Vallee's assistance the company had assignments from clients such as Toyota and Nissan. By 1989, the work that the company had been doing in the west coast had secured as second production facility there, along with moves to seek out clients and opportunities outside the automotive industry, and experimented with developing its consulting capabilities.

Emergence (1990-2000s) 

In the beginning of the 1990s GPJ expanded with offices in Boston, Chicago and Seattle. This was also brought along with the company winning the account of Chrysler International, leading to the openings of the first European offices in Brussels, Belgium for the firm. By this point GPJ's annual revenues were at $100 million or more, and the company had between 300 and 500 employees, with dependence on seasonal needs.

March 1996 saw GPJ's main headquarters and production operation moved to Auburn Hills, Michigan to a larger 300,000-square foot facility. Many other moves followed with the administrative, sales, and design departments relocated to a new 36,000-square foot state-of-the-art paint shop and a 100,000-square foot warehouse space for storing client exhibit pieces. Additionally new offices in San Jose, California were opened to cater to the emergent computer electronics industry and contracts were won with Cisco Systems, Siebel and Intel. In that same year, Robert Vallee Jr. gained the title of CEO in addition to being the company's president.

At this point, GPJ's client list included 40 Fortune 500 companies with 90% of sales deriving from the auto industry still. Creation of high production visual displays for auto shows became a new hallmark for the company, with each custom made and incorporating technologies like simulated-motion and virtual reality.

By June 1998, GPJ had been selected to function as IBM's exhibition management services worldwide. 1,000 business shows were added to the company's event schedule with a $40 million assignment. The year also saw the alliance with National Commerce Bank Services in installing itself within locations inside supermarkets and retail stores.

In March 1999, GPJ bought a majority stake in Raumtechnik Messebau GmbH in Stuttgart, Germany and later renamed Raumtechnik Messebau & Event Marketing GmbH. Acquisition of the firm added 100 employees with $18 million of annual sales. Two months later the company once again bought stakes in Project Worldwide, a London-based creative communications agency.

In the same year, the company also produced the North American International Auto Show (NAIAS) in Detroit with countless of automotive clients utilising rotating turntables, cars, videos, graphics, and other special effects.

In September 2001, GPJ acquired Designtroupe, a company from Australia. This acquisition brought the company into the Asian Pacific region opening offices in Sydney, Singapore, Tokyo. In the same year it acquired Conference Planners of Burlingame California, an event management company owned by CEO Chris Meyer.

A joint venture in China with Highteam Public Relations Co. Ltd. of Beijing in the fall of 2002, brought the company 110 employees with offices in three cities and access into the developing China region.

Corporate affairs

Notable projects 

In recent years, GPJ has participated and organized in larger, more globally significant events and exhibits including major events in China: the 2008 Beijing Olympics and the 2010 Shanghai World Expo, as well as starting contributing to its other more domestic projects, the Brand X Challenge, amongst its standard trade shows and industry specific events.

2008 Beijing Summer Olympics 

George P. Johnson was engaged with two first-tier Olympic sponsors helping run, design and create the exhibitions in the pavilions which were situated on the Olympic green. The company sought to improve and expand its international image by undertaking one of the biggest known events in the Mainland China region. Robert Albitz, GPJ's Senior Vice President of worldwide creative, said that the question was "how to build a compelling experience" that would transcend linguistic and cultural gaps. Furthermore, GPJ used Lenovo's technology to its fullest in the latter's exhibition, especially the integration of computerized wrist bands and blue screen technology to create backgrounds for photos, Albitz mentioned that "It gives us a chance to show off Lenovo's proprietary Veriface facial-recognition software". Likewise was done for the Bank of China exhibits where the firm sought to tell the story of the bank's involvement with the Olympics and its history as well as use the former example of blue screen technology in capturing simulated backgrounds.

George P. Johnson played a prominent role in the creation and design of the Lenovo and Bank of China pavilions for the 2008 Beijing Olympic Games. Utilizing heavily interactive exhibits focused on audience participation, the two pavilions both boast interactive game experiences and work through presentations via storytelling. Lenovo's pavilion in the Olympic green hosted a game to demonstrate Lenovo's active protection systems while The Bank of China's pavilion hosted similar features, having them participate in a virtual stock market game and an interactive sports experience where one can play badminton against a member of China's national team; a Wii-like experience. Both these pavilions had hospitality suites for private interaction. The bank's pavilion was under development for over eight months while the Lenovo exhibit was under more than a year of development with GPJ.

GPJ received industry awards and accolades for the design of The Bank of China exhibition; two employees were bestowed top design honors for their contributions to the exhibition.

2010 Shanghai World Expo 

GPJ participated in the creating and designing the Australian and Cisco pavilions for the 2010 World Expo that took place in Shanghai. Having won a public tender and being selected for designing the Australian pavilion, the company was given $3 million to create an exhibit that represented the culture and diversity of Australia. The interactions throughout the exhibit centered on content without narrative due to the Mandarin speaking majority among the expo attendees. The entire exhibit was designed around the usage of interactive visual art, acrobatics, performance art, non-narrative music, film, dance and multimedia elements.

George P. Johnson was also awarded an Innovation Award by Cisco, whose pavilion GPJ also worked on.

Brand X Challenge 

In 2013, George P. Johnson developed a competition for students to promote the skills and values needed for success in the marketing industry. The Brand X Challenge seeks to promote the industry and get the program or similar activities within college and university syllabuses. In conjunction with EventMarketer and Under Armour, GPJ managed to get 50+ teams of students from across the USA to participate. The competition consisted of designing mock sponsorships campaigns for UA at the 2014 Olympic Games in Sochi, Russia with the various elements and stages of event managing including, pre-event social media interactions to onsite work at the event. Thirty-nine judges from a host of famous top brands served as judges for the competition, these companies/brands include Gatorade, Target, FedEx, Coca Cola Co., IBM etc.

A team from a North Carolina university won the event.

References

External links 
Official Website
Company Statistics

Business services companies established in 1914
Marketing companies of the United States
1914 establishments in Michigan